The Mulroney family is a Canadian political family originating from Quebec. The family includes the 18th prime minister of Canada Brian Mulroney.

Members 
Brian Mulroney, 18th Prime Minister of Canada
Mila Mulroney, Progressive Conservative political campaigner, wife of Brian Mulroney
Caroline Mulroney, Investment banker and Ontario politician
Ben Mulroney, television host
Jessica Mulroney,  fashion stylist, wife of Ben Mulroney
Mark Mulroney, third child
Nicolas Mulroney, fourth child

See also
Trudeau family
Ford family (Canada)

 
Canadian people of Irish descent
Canadian families
Political families of Canada